Filippo Maria Scardina (born 26 February 1992) is an Italian footballer who plays as a forward for  club Fiorenzuola.

Career
Scardina was called up to Roma's first team against PFC CSKA Sofia in the UEFA Europa League. He entered as a substitute for Stefano Okaka Chuka in the 81st minute and scored a goal 8 minutes later, setting the final score on a 3-0 win for Roma; he became the youngest the debutant in the history of the club. However this was his only cap with the club.

After not finding space within Roma's main team, he was sent out on loan and has been in force to U.S. Poggibonsi since 2012.

On 28 July 2018, he joined Pro Piacenza.

On 14 January 2019, he signed a 2.5-year contract with Fano.

On 7 July 2019, he moved to Sicula Leonzio.

On 27 August 2020 he signed with Pergolettese.

On 5 July 2022, Scardina moved to Fiorenzuola.

Personal life 
His mother is the actress Fiorenza Marchegiani.

References

External links
 
 

1992 births
Living people
Footballers from Rome
Italian footballers
Association football forwards
Serie C players
A.S. Roma players
Como 1907 players
F.C. Esperia Viareggio players
A.S. Gubbio 1910 players
U.S. Poggibonsi players
U.S. Città di Pontedera players
S.S. Racing Club Roma players
A.C.R. Messina players
Siracusa Calcio players
F.C. Pro Vercelli 1892 players
A.S. Pro Piacenza 1919 players
Alma Juventus Fano 1906 players
A.S.D. Sicula Leonzio players
U.S. Pergolettese 1932 players
U.S. Fiorenzuola 1922 S.S. players
Italy youth international footballers